Belediye Kütahyaspor is a Turkish sports club from Kütahya, in western Turkey.

The clubs plays in blue and light blue kits, and have done so since their formation in 1966.

League participations

 1st League: 1966–1976, 1980–1985, 1987–1991, 1992–1994
 2nd League: 1976–1978, 1979–1980, 1985–1987, 1991–1992, 1994–2003
 3rd League: 2003–2008, 2016–2017, 2020–
 Regional Amateur League: 2010–2016, 2017–2020
 Amateur Level: 1978–1979, 2008–2010

Stadium
Currently the team plays at the 11,500 capacity Dumlupınar Stadium.

External links
Kutahyaspor on TFF.org
Kutahyaspor News Site
Twitter

Football clubs in Turkey
1966 establishments in Turkey